Pancoran is a district of South Jakarta, one of the five administrative cities which form Jakarta, Indonesia. Pancoran district was originally part of Mampang Prapatan district until it was divided in 1985.

The boundaries of Pancoran district are Ciliwung River to the east, Mampang River to the west, and Kapten Tendean Road - Jend. Gatot Subroto - Letjen. Haryono MT. Tollway to the north.

Kelurahan (urban villages)
The district of Pancoran is divided into six kelurahan or administrative villages: 
Kalibata - area code 12740
Rawa Jati - area code 12750
Duren Tiga - area code 12760
Cikoko - area code 12770
Pengadegan - area code 12770
Pancoran - area code 12780

List of important places
Statue of Dirgantara
Kalibata National Heroes Cemetery

Districts of Jakarta
South Jakarta